Ranunculus uncinatus is a species of buttercup known by the common names woodland buttercup and little buttercup. It is native to western North America from Alaska to California to New Mexico, where it grows in wet, wooded habitat such as forest streambanks. It is a perennial herb producing a slender, erect stem which may exceed half a meter in maximum height. The lightly hairy lower leaves have blades deeply divided into three toothed lobes borne on long petioles. The upper leaves are smaller and divided into narrower lobes. The flower has four or five yellow petals a few millimeters long around a central receptacle and many stamens and pistils. The fruit is an achene borne in a spherical cluster.

References

External links

Jepson Manual Treatment
Washington Burke Museum
Photo gallery

uncinatus
Flora of North America